Crimson and Blue is the 1993 album by guitarist Phil Keaggy, released on Myrrh Records.

Crimson and Blue found Phil Keaggy surrounded by old friends making new music, in an old Victorian cottage owned by Brown Bannister. The Dugout (now Vibe56) was in the middle of Music Row. Its high ceilings, hardwood floors, and vintage equipment made it a perfect place to record a rock record.

Producer/guitarist Lynn Nichols and organist Phil Madeira had been Keaggy's bandmates in the Phil Keaggy Band in the 1970s.  Drummer John Sferra was Keaggy's oldest friend, and partner in the band Glass Harp. Bassist Wade Jaynes was Nichols' bandmate from Chagall Guevara.

Track listing
All songs were written by Phil Keaggy, unless otherwise noted.

 "Shouts of Joy" (Music by Keaggy, Words by Ray Repp)  – 5:54
 "World of Mine"  – 5:38
 "Everywhere I Look" (Phil Madeira)  – 4:26
 "Love Divine"  – 2:23
 "Reunion of Friends"  – 4:11
 "All There is to Know" (Keaggy/Madeira)  – 3:47
 "When Will I Ever Learn to Live in God" (Van Morrison)  – 6:40
 "Stone Eyes" (Keaggy/Nichols/Madeira)  – 7:01
 "I Will Be There"  – 6:51
 "Don't Pass Me By" (Keaggy/Nichols)  – 3:44
 "John the Revelator" (Traditional)  – 8:04
 "Doin' Nothin'"  – 8:25
 "Nothing But the Blood" (Traditional)  – 2:44

Personnel
 Phil Keaggy – guitars, lead vocals
 John Sferra – drums
 Wade Jaynes – bass
 Phil Madeira – Hammond B-3, keyboards, background vocals
 Lynn Nichols – guitar, background vocals
 Mike Mead – percussion, background vocals
 Ashley Cleveland – background vocals
 John Mark Painter – Mellotron, trumpet
 Jimmy A – background vocals

Production notes
 Lynn Nichols – producer
 Bill Deaton – engineer at the Dugout, Nashville, Tennessee, mixing
 JB – additional engineer
 Ben Pearson – photography

References

1993 albums
Phil Keaggy albums